Alejandro Rodríguez (born 9 July 1986 in Pando) is a Uruguayan footballer.

Career
He made his debut on 17 February 2007, against Central Español.

Rodriguez played for Uruguay U-17 team at the 2003 South American Under-17 Football Championship, which was held in Bolivia.

External links
 
 

1986 births
Living people
People from Pando, Uruguay
Uruguayan footballers
Uruguayan expatriate footballers
Uruguay youth international footballers
Association football defenders
Uruguayan Primera División players
Uruguayan Segunda División players
Paraguayan Primera División players
Ecuadorian Serie A players
Club Nacional de Football players
Rampla Juniors players
Plaza Colonia players
C.D. Malacateco players
El Tanque Sisley players
Club Guaraní players
Manta F.C. footballers
Ermis Aradippou FC players
Montevideo City Torque players
Sportivo Cerrito players
Expatriate footballers in Ecuador
Expatriate footballers in Guatemala
Expatriate footballers in Paraguay
Expatriate footballers in Cyprus
Uruguayan expatriate sportspeople in Ecuador
Uruguayan expatriate sportspeople in Guatemala
Uruguayan expatriate sportspeople in Paraguay
Uruguayan expatriate sportspeople in Cyprus